MEGA Role-Playing System, Fantasy Edition is a role-playing game published by MEGA Games Ltd. (U.K.) in 1987.

Description
MEGA Role-Playing System is a fantasy system, translated from a Norwegian design, with a distinctly Norse slant on swords-and-sorcery. The rules cover character creation (including a detailed list of characters' quirks), combat, priestly and wizardly magic, and more.

Publication history
MEGA Role-Playing System was designed by Isy Allon and Ben Brakas and published by MEGA Games Ltd. in 1987 as a 144-page hardcover book. MEGA Games planned to publish further books using the same rules system but in different genres, but the only other publications released were a gamemaster's screen, and an adventure, Ogre Forest.

Reception
In Issue 6 of The Games Machine, John Woods was initially pleased by the quality of the book and the clean layout. But he found the rules laboriously complex, and not well written, commenting, "This is a particularly serious problem in the sections explaining the more complex parts of the rules such as the combat system. What turn out, on careful reading, to be fairly sound and straightforward rules are explained in such a hurried and confusing fashion as to make them almost unintelligible." He concluded on a down note, saying, "All in all the system is exceedingly disappointing, with what I can only describe as a half-finished feel. [...] I really can’t recommend MEGA to anyone."

Reviews
White Wolf #18 (Nov./Dec., 1989)

References

British role-playing games
Fantasy role-playing games
Role-playing games introduced in 1987